Fathlul Rahman (born August 16, 1984) is an Indonesian footballer that currently plays for Barito Putera in the Liga 1.

Club career statistics

References

External links

1984 births
Association football defenders
Living people
Indonesian footballers
Liga 1 (Indonesia) players
Persela Lamongan players
PSM Makassar players
Place of birth missing (living people)